Domen Novak (born 12 July 1995) is a Slovenian cyclist, who currently rides for UCI WorldTeam .

Career
He was named in the startlist for the 2017 Vuelta a España. In May 2018, he was named in the startlist for the 2018 Giro d'Italia. In 2023 he will join  as a domestique.

Major results

2013
 1st  Road race, National Junior Road Championships
 8th Road race, UEC European Junior Road Championships
2014
 1st  Young rider classification, Sibiu Cycling Tour
2015
 1st  Young rider classification, Tour of Slovenia
 10th Giro del Belvedere
2016
 Szlakiem Grodów Piastowskich
1st  Mountains classification
1st Young rider classification
 3rd Overall Tour of Małopolska
1st Young rider classification
 3rd GP Laguna
 6th Overall Tour of Croatia
1st  Young rider classification
2017
 7th Overall Tour of Japan
1st  Young rider classification
2018
 2nd Road race, National Road Championships
 10th Overall Tour of Croatia
2019
 1st  Road race, National Road Championships
 5th Overall CRO Race
2022
 3rd Overall Tour of Slovenia
 5th Road race, National Road Championships

Grand Tour general classification results timeline

References

External links

1995 births
Living people
Slovenian male cyclists
Sportspeople from Novo Mesto